Daniel Ellsworth and The Great Lakes (DE+TGL) is an American indie rock band from Nashville, Tennessee, formed in 2010. The band consists of Daniel Ellsworth (vocals, keys), Timon Lance (guitar), and Marshall Skinner (bass). The band tours extensively around North America and has released four studio albums, including two LPs and one EP: Kid Tiger, Civilized Man,, Bemidji and Fashion. DE+TGL most recently released two EPs from an extended body of studio recordings, "Chapter One" and "Chapter Two." Their next full-length LP is due out fall 2018.

History
Civilized Man (2011-2013)In 2010, the band recorded their debut album Civilized Man, engineered and co-produced by Mark Nevers who has also worked with Will Oldham, Andrew Bird, Yo La Tengo and Lambchop. The album was recorded at Beech House Studios in Nashville, Tennessee in May 2011. This album includes a former member, Ricky Perry, on guitar. Perry left the band shortly after the release of the album.

Amazon MP3 named Civilized Man the number 76 album out of the top 100 albums of 2011. The online music retailer also named the band's single, "Shoe Fits," the number seven song of the 2011. In February 2012, Civilized Man charted on Billboard's Heatseeker's chart at position 18. Later that year, The Deli Magazine voted DE+TGL as Nashville's Best Emerging Artist of 2012.Kid Tiger and Bemidji (2013-2016)In May 2013, DE+TGL recorded their second full-length album at Sputnik Sound in Nashville, Tennessee. The album was recorded by Grammy Award winner Vance Powell, who has worked with Chris Stapleton, Kings of Leon, Jack White, and The White Stripes. While in studio, the band was featured in an article in Paste Magazine, including an interview and a write-up saying "There’s very little you can guarantee in life, but one of the surer bets is that Daniel Ellsworth and The Great Lakes will make you dance." In anticipation of the Kid Tiger album, Esquire named DE+TGL one of their 15 Bands to Watch in 2014. Kid Tiger was released on March 4, 2014. 

The songs on Kid Tiger and Bemidji, released March 7, 2015, were recorded in the same session with Powell. The 17 songs were divided into two separate releases based on where the songs were written. Songs on the Kid Tiger album were written in Nashville, while those on Bemidji were written at a remote cabin in Bemidji, MN. The album, Kid Tiger, is named after a fictitious character in Bob Dylan's book, Tarantula.Chapter One and Chapter Two (2016-Present)

While touring North America, DE+TGL played the Austin City Limits Music Festival in October 2016. During the winter, the band started working on a new collection of songs in Nashville's Elephant Lady Studio and Blackbird Studio. Produced, engineered, and mixed by Kyle Andrews, these new songs are slated for release over the course of fall 2017-summer 2018. The first single from this body of work, "Paralyzed", was released on Friday, September 15, 2017. The second single, "Control"  was released on October 20, 2017. Their first EP of 2018, "Chapter One," was released on January 19. Their second EP, "Chapter Two," from the same body of studio recordings was released on April 27, 2018, and featured in Billboard, Parade Magazine, Earmilk, Paste, Ones to Watch and Relix.

Albums
 Civilized Man (2011)
 Kid Tiger (2014)
 Bemidji (2016)
 Fashion (2018)

References

 Faboulous Four New Summer albums Review of "Civilized Man"
 Amazon.com Outstanding 2011 Albums You Might Have Missed
 "Shoe Fits" Video Premiere on American Songwriter
 Daniel Ellsworth & The Great Lakes official Biography
 Sonic Bids - Daniel Ellsworth & The Great Lakes
 Paste Magazine - "Bleeding Tongue" Music Video Premiere 
 iTunes - The Offspring (TV Show) Soundtrack Season 3

External links
 
 
 
 Blackbird Studio

Alternative rock groups from Tennessee
Indie rock musical groups from Tennessee
Musical groups from Nashville, Tennessee